Karl Eduard Zetzsche (March 11, 1830, in Altenberg – April 18, 1894, in Dresden) was a German mathematician and physicist.

Biography
He studied in Dresden and Vienna, and in 1856 entered the Austrian telegraph service. In 1858, he became a teacher in the industrial high school at Chemnitz and, in 1876, a professor of telegraphy in the Polytechnic Institute at Dresden. In 1880, he was appointed telegraph engineer in the Imperial Post Office at Berlin. In 1887, he retired from public service.

Works
Die Kopiertelegraphen, Typendrucktelegraphen und die Doppeltelegraphie (1865)
Die elektrischen Telegraphen (1860)
Katechismus der elektrischen Telegraphie (6th ed., 1883)
Abriss der Geschichte der elektrischen Telegraphie (1874)
Die Entwickelung der antomatischen Telegraphie (1875)
Handbuch der elektrischen Telegraphie (together with Frölich, Henneberg, and Kohlfürst) (1877–1895)

References

 This work in turn cites: Voretzsch, Zur Erinnerung an K. E. Zetzsche (Altenburg, 1894)

External links

 

1830 births
1894 deaths
19th-century German mathematicians
University of Vienna alumni
19th-century German physicists